"Rock Ur Body" is a Korean-language song recorded by South Korean idol group VIXX. It was released physically and as a digital single on August 14, 2012, through Jellyfish Entertainment. The song served as VIXX's second single. "Rock Ur Body" was composed by Shinsadong Tiger and co-produced by Choi Kyu-sung. It was written by Choi Kyu-sung by Ho Yang Lee.

The song's music video was directed by Hong Won Ki.

Background and release
The music video for "Rock Ur Body" was released on August 14, the same day as the album release on VIXX's official YouTube channel.

Track listing
The credits are adapted from the official homepage of the group.

Credits and personnel
VIXX - vocals
Cha Hakyeon (N) - Lead vocals, background vocals
Jung Taekwoon (Leo) - Main vocals, background vocals
Lee Jaehwan (Ken) - Main vocals, background vocals
Kim Wonsik (Ravi) - rap, songwriting
Lee Hongbin - vocals
Han Sanghyuk (Hyuk) - vocals
Shinsadong Tiger - producer, music
Choi Kyu-sung - songwriting, producer, music
Ho Yang Lee - producer, music

Chart performance

Release history

References

External links
 Rock 'Ur Body - Single on iTunes

VIXX songs
2012 songs
Korean-language songs
Song recordings produced by Shinsadong Tiger
Jellyfish Entertainment singles